R. M. Fink (also known as Rita M. Fink) is an American screenwriter best known as one of the creators of Dirty Harry.

Fink also co-wrote, with her husband Harry Julian Fink, such films Big Jake and Cahill U.S. Marshal.

References

External links

American screenwriters
American women screenwriters
Living people
Year of birth missing (living people)
21st-century American women